Seyyed Khan (also Romanized as Seyyed Khān) is a village in Jahanabad Rural District, in the Central District of Hirmand County, Sistan and Baluchestan Province, Iran. At the 2006 census, its population was 121, in 26 families.

References 

Populated places in Hirmand County